Jonathan James-Moore (22 March 1946 – 20 November 2005) was an English theatre manager and BBC radio producer and executive.

He was born in Worcestershire and educated at Bromsgrove School and Emmanuel College, Cambridge, where he graduated with a degree in engineering and served as Footlights president. He managed theatres in Cumbria and London before joining the BBC as a radio producer in 1978. He eventually became Head of Light Entertainment, where he oversaw many of the most successful comedy series of the 1990s, including On the Hour,  Knowing Me, Knowing You,  Lee and Herring, The Harpoon, Harry Hill's Fruit Corner, and The League of Gentlemen.

James-Moore left the BBC in 1999 but continued to work in radio until his death from cancer in 2005.

References
Guardian obituary
Independent obituary

BBC radio producers
English radio producers
English theatre managers and producers
Mass media people from Worcestershire
Alumni of Emmanuel College, Cambridge
1946 births
2005 deaths
People educated at Bromsgrove School
Deaths from cancer in England
20th-century English businesspeople